Tina Basich (born June 29, 1969) is an American snowboarder, originally from Sacramento, California.

Career 
Basich began snowboarding in 1986, when the sport was still new.  She is noted for winning a variety of competitions from the 1980s onward, and for helping in the design of outerwear and snowboards for women, including one of the first women's pro-models for SIMS Snowboards.

Achievements 
First woman to successfully land a backside 720 in competition (at the 1998 Winter X Games Big Air)
Shares the title of having first women's pro-model board with Shannon Dunn-Downing
Was one of the founders of Boarding for Breast Cancer
Broke her right fibula trying a 720 at Mammoth
Hosted girl action sports TV show GKA
Autobiography Pretty Good for a Girl details her snowboarding career
Opened a shop called My Favorite Things

Competition history 
2000 G Shock Air and Style - Corner Challenge - 4th
2000 Sims Invitational World Snowboard Championships - Whistler = Big Air - 2nd
1999 Boarding for Breast Cancer - Big Air - 1st
1998 Winter X Games - Snowboard Big Air - 1st
1998 Winter X Games - Snowboard Slopestyle - 6th
1997 Winter X Games Snowboard Big Air - 3rd
1997 ESPN Freeride - Aspen - Big Air - 1st
1997 King of the Hill - Extreme - 2nd
1997 US Open - Halfpipe - 2nd

References 

American female snowboarders
1969 births
Living people
Sportspeople from Sacramento, California
21st-century American women